In linguistics, assibilation is a sound change resulting in a sibilant consonant. It is a form of spirantization and is commonly the final phase of palatalization.

Arabic
A characteristic of Mashreqi varieties of Arabic (particularly Levantine and Egyptian) is to assibilate the interdental consonants of Modern Standard Arabic (MSA) in certain contexts (defined more culturally than phonotactically).

Diachronically, the phoneme represented by the letter  has, in some dialects, experienced assibilation as well. It has experienced extensive change in pronunciation over the centuries, and is pronounced  at least six different ways across the assorted varieties of Arabic.

Bantu languages
In the history of several Bantu groups, including the Southern Bantu languages, the Proto-Bantu consonant *k was palatalised before a close or near-close vowel. Thus, the class 7 noun prefix *kɪ̀- appears in e.g. Zulu as isi-, Sotho  as se-, Venda as tshi- and Shona as chi-.

Finnic languages
The alternation can be seen in dialectal and inflected word forms: Finnish  "to deny" →  ~  "s/he denied";  "water" vs.  "as water".

An intermediate stage  is preserved in South Estonian in certain cases: tsiga "pig", vs. Finnish , Standard (North) Estonian .

Germanic languages

Greek

In Proto-Greek, the earlier combinations *ty, *thy and *dy assibilated to become alveolar affricates, *ts and *dz, in what is called the first palatalization. Later, a second round of palatalization occurred and initially produced geminate palatal *ťť and *ďď from various consonants, followed by *y. The former was depalatalised to plain geminate tt in some dialects and was assibilated to ss in others. The latter evolved into an affricate dz in all Greek dialects:

 -> PG  > Homeric  > Attic  "this much" (Latin )
 > PG  > Homeric  > Attic  "middle" (Latin )

Some Greek dialects later underwent yet another round of assibilation.  shifted to  finally in Attic and Ionic but not in Doric.
Doric  – Attic-Ionic  "he/she places"

Romance languages
The word "assibilation" itself contains an example of the phenomenon, as it is pronounced . The Classical Latin  was pronounced  (for example,  was pronounced  and  ).

Most dialects of Quebec French apply a more recent assibilation to all dental plosive consonants immediately before high front vowels and associated semivowels, so that the sequences  become pronounced  respectively.

Assibilation can occur in some varieties of Spanish such as in Ecuador and Mexico. It is closely related to the phonetic term sibilation.

Slavic languages

Palatalization effects were widespread in the history of Proto-Slavic. In the first palatalization, various consonants were converted into postalveolar fricatives and affricates, while in the second and third palatalizations, the results were alveolar.

Some Slavic languages underwent yet another round of palatalisation. In Polish, in particular, dental consonants became alveolo-palatal fricatives and affricates when followed by a front vowel.

See also
 Assimilation (linguistics)

References

Phonology
Phonetics
Sound changes